Fergus Mills (October 11, 1840 – January 23, 1924) was a member of the Wisconsin State Assembly during the 1876 session. He represented Crawford County, Wisconsin as a Reformer Democrat. An English emigrant, Mills was born on October 11, 1840 in Oldham, Lancashire.

References

External links

People from Oldham
English emigrants to the United States
19th-century English people
People from Crawford County, Wisconsin
1840 births
1924 deaths
Democratic Party members of the Wisconsin State Assembly